(15 March 1902 – 16 August 1987) was a Japanese actress and master of traditional Japanese dance. She is often considered Japan's first female movie star.

Career
Kurishima was the daughter of Sagoromo Kurishima, an actor and newspaper reporter. Her aunt on her mother's side, Fumiko Katsuragi, was also an actress. She learned traditional Japanese dance from an early age and used the name Kakō Mizuki when performing. Also appearing on stage, she entered the Shōchiku studio in 1921 and debuted in Henry Kotani's adaptation of Natsume Sōseki's The Poppy. Often appearing as the tragic heroine of films directed by her future husband, Yoshinobu Ikeda, she is considered Japan's first popular female movie star, especially considering that male onnagata played female roles in the movies up until the early 1920s. She retired from the screen in 1938 and concentrated on teaching dance, becoming the leader of her own school. She did return to the screen in 1956, however, to appear in Mikio Naruse's Flowing.

Selected filmography

 The Poppy (虞美人草, Gubijinsō) (1921)
 Denkô to sono tsuma (1921)
 Toranku (1921)
 Omoi tsuma (1921)
 Ho no namida (1921)
 Yuku kumo (1921)
 Ono ga tsumi (1921)
 Nasanu naka (1921)
 Yama e kaeru (1921)
 Kenbu no musume (1921) - Yûko
 Shakko (1921)
 Kure yuku ekiji (1921)
 Tokuri (1921)
 Kyokukô nami o terasu (1921)
 Konjiki yasha (1922)
 Umi no kiwami made (1922)
 Hototogisu (1922)
 Chikyôdai (1922)
 Chizôme no gûnki (1922)
 Haha no kokoro (1922)
 Gion yawa (1922)
 Sôfuren (1922)
 Hikareyuku hi (1922) - Ryohei's daughter Sawako
 Yôjo no mai (1922) - Mizushima Kaneko
 Kokawa-dera (1922)
 Eien no nazo (1922)
 Zanko (1922) - Naoya's daughter Toshie
 Yuki no yawa (1922)
 Kessakushûsui konjiki yasha (1922)
 Sendō kouta (船頭小唄) (1923) - Okimi
 My Friend (1923) - Elder sister (segment 2)
 Shiniyuku tsuma (1923) - Wife Kimie
 Futatsu no michi (1923)
 Gendai no josei (1923) - Younger daughter Taeko
 Yami Wo Yuku (1923) - Sachie / Sachie's daughter Midori
 Nasuna koi (1923) - Baishi - daughter of Monsei
 Jikatsu suru onna (1923) - Hayase Kyoko
 Haha (1923) - Sadao's wife Shizue
 Daitokyo no ushimitsudoki daiippen higekihen (1923) - Tsuyuka
 Mizumo no hana (水藻の花) (1923) - Ohana
 Kosome to kinya (1923) - Kosome
 Oyako no tabiji (1923)
 Tsumi no tobira (1923) - Akizuki Masako
 Ohimegusa (1923) - Otsuyu, Mother
 Yuhoshu Ono ga tsumi (1923)
 Kanojo no unmei (1924)
 Eien no Haha (1924) - Misao
 Sweet Home (1924) - Factory woman Ofusa
 Hatachi no Koro #3 (1924) - Daughter
 Nageki no kujaku (嘆きの孔雀) (1924) - Murata Miyako
 Hototogisu namiko (1924)
 Koi no Hikyoku (1925) - Tsuyuko
 Aru Onna no Hanashi (1925) - Proprietress Ochika
 Daichi wa hohoemu (大地は微笑む) (1925, part 1-3) - Daughter Shuren
 Mahjong (1925)
 Umi no himitsu (1925)
 Kanashiki koi no gensō (悲しき恋の幻想) (1925) - Forest maiden Hiname
 Hakushaku Reijo (1925)
 Koizuma (1925) - Haruko
 Hojoka (1925) - Wife Sonoko, Choran
 Sabishiki Michi (1925) - Daughter Okiku
 Shô-chan no Kamata hômon (1925)
 Kowareta Ningyo (1926) - Maiko Haruyu
 Sayoko (1926) - Nagasa Sayoko
 Shi no Komoriuta (1926) - Takayama Kiyo
 Chinpira Tantei (1926) - Hideko
 Utsukushiki Inori (1926) - Blind woman Michie
 Nageki no bara (1926) - Kikue's friend
 Junanbana (1926) - Kikukawa Sumiko
 Yôfu gonin onna - Dai gohen: Reijô Osumi (1926)
 Koi no Wakare Michi (1927)
 Hisako no hanashi (1927) - Hisako, daughter of Shincho
 Shinju fujin (1927)
 Kindai Nyobo Kaizo (1927)
 Tama wo Nageutsu (1927)
 Seishun no Komichi (1928)
 Tengoku no Hito (1928)
 Onna no isshô (1928) - Hanako Andô
 Fûfu (1928)
 Tôge no Rakuen (1928)
 Ai no Yukusue (1928)
 Kângeki no harû (1929)
 Aîjin tokie no mâki (1929)
 Tasogare no yuwaku (1929)
 Ukiyo komichi (1929)
 Kibô (1929)
 Oyaji to sono ko (1929)
 Kotoshidake (1929)
 Kekkongaku nyûmon (1930) - Toshiko, his wife
 Reijin (1930) - Tomoko Mizuhara
 Kânôjo wa dôkoê iku (1930)
 Onnâgokorô wa mîdasumâji (1930)
 Ojôsan (1930) - Young Lady
 Machî no runpên (1931)
 Shimai zenpen (1931)
 Shimai kohen (1931)
 Ômoîde oki onna (1931)
 Depâto no himegimi (1932)
 Sôshiju (1932)
 Sei naru chibusa (1932)
 Tsubakihime (1932)
 Kujakubune (1933)
 Seidon (1933) - Sachiko
 Every-Night Dreams (1933) - Omitsu
 Îro wa nioedô (1933)
 Kanraku no yo wa fukete (1934)
 Yumê no sasayâki (1934)
 Nihon josei no uta (1934)
 Daigaku no wakadanna - Nihonbare (1934)
 Haha no ai (1935)
 Kajuen no onna (1935)
 Eikyû no ai ramûru ekuruneru zenpen (1935)
 Eikyû no ai ramûru ekuruneru kohen (1935)
 What Did the Lady Forget? (淑女は何を忘れたか, Shukujo wa nani o wasureta ka) (1937) - Tokiko, madam in Kojimachi
 Nakimushi kozo (1938) - Sadako, Keikichi's mother
 Flowing (流れる, Nagareru) (1956) - Ohama (final film role)

References

External links
 
 

Japanese film actresses
1902 births
1987 deaths
Japanese female dancers
Japanese silent film actresses
20th-century Japanese actresses
Recipients of the Medal with Purple Ribbon